Simplemente La Verdad is a 2008 album released by Franco De Vita. The album received a Latin Grammy Award nomination for Best Singer-Songwriter Album.

Track listing

 "Simplemente La Verdad" 
 "Si Un Día Te Vuelvo A Ver" 
 "Mi Sueño"
 "Probablemente"  
 "Cuando Tus Ojos Me Miran"   
 "No Se Olvida"  
 "Callo"  
 "Palabras Del Corazón"  
 "Cántame" 
 "10 Años Y Un Día"
 "Cuando Tus Ojos Me Miran (Libre)"

References

2008 albums
Franco De Vita albums
Spanish-language albums